Jane Hall is an Australian actress, comedian, writer and presenter. She is best known for playing Rebecca Napier on the soap opera Neighbours.

Early life
Born in Hamilton Victoria, Hall grew up in the Dandenong Ranges. She attended Tecoma Primary School, Belgrave South Primary School and Upwey High School.  Hall studied drama at MBCTA Youth Theatre and at high school she appeared in High School productions.

Career
A child actress, Hall began her acting career in 1985, with a guest role in the television series The Henderson Kids, opposite Stefan Dennis. She performed in school productions at Belgrave South Primary School and also appeared in amateur High School productions.

Hall reached large audiences through her long running role in situation comedy series All Together Now, which also starred Jon English, Rebecca Gibney and Steven Jacobs. Hall played Anna Sumner, a twin who finds out her real father is a 1970s rock star living in the past. The program focused on the comedy situations in dealing with this discovery and her father's eccentric personality. Hall previously regularly filled in for Kate Langbroek on Nova 100's breakfast show Hughesy, Kate & Dave, while Langbroek was on maternity leave. .

In mid-2007 Hall joined Neighbours on Network Ten, playing Rebecca Napier. On 10 October 2010 it was announced that Hall had resigned and she left in 2011.  Of her departure, Hall said "I've decided it's time to say 'au revoir' to Erinsborough. It's sad to be leaving… but I'm looking forward to the future and new and exciting acting adventures." In October 2013 it was announced that Hall would be reprising the role of Rebecca on Neighbours for a four-week guest stint. Filming took place in November 2013 and aired in Australia in February 2014, and March 2014 in the UK. . In August 2019 it was announced that Hall would once again reprise her role of Rebecca for a guest stint later in the year.

In January 2012, it was announced that she would be presenting Chrissie & Jane on Mix 1011 with Chrissie Swan and Jamie Row.

In August 2012, Hall replaced Yumi Stynes co-hosting the 3PM Pick-Up on Mix 1011 with Chrissie Swan. After Swan was axed, it was announced that Hall would take over the breakfast radio show Matt & Jane with Matt Tilley on the rebranded KIIS 101.1

In October 2015, Hall announced that she would leave KIIS 101.1 at the end of the year to return to acting.

In 2019 Hall joined the cast of local prison drama Wentworth where she played General Manager Ann Reynolds. Hall was one of four legacy characters that were part of Wentworth'''s final season. Reynolds was originally in Prisoner played by the late Gerda Nicolson. Hall put her career to be a midwife on hold to be a part of Wentworth.

Personal life
Hall has a daughter, Lucia, with her former husband, Australian actor Vince Colosimo, whom she met on the set of A Country Practice. Hall moved out of the couple's former home in Northcote, Victoria in January 2007.

Film roles
 Razzle Dazzle: A Journey Into Dance (2007) as Miss Elizabeth
 The Nugget (2002) as Lucy
 Rip Girls (2000) as Arlene
 The Craic (1999) as Alice
 Dead Letter Office (1998) as Heather

Television roles
Bluey as Rusty's Mum (voice)
Frayed (2021) as SandyWentworth (2020–2021) as Ann ReynoldsOne Born Every Minute Australia (2019) as Herself (Narrator)Newton's Law as Jackie Russo (2017)
 House Husbands as Sarah (2012)
 Are You Smarter Than a 5th Grader? as Herself (2009)
 The 7pm Project as Herself (2009)
 Rove as Herself (2008)
 Neighbours as Rebecca Napier (2007–2011, 2014, 2019)
 The Starter Wife as Sharon (2007)
 Life as Rachel Cardamone (2005)
 Marshall Law as Prue Stanley (2002)
 Something in the Air as Janine Baker (2002)
 Blue Heelers as Penny Beck (2001) 
 The Secret Life Of Us as Vivianne (2001)
 One Way Ticket as Kate Stark (1997)
 A Country Practice  as Jessamy 'Jess' Morrison (1994)
 All Together Now as Anna Sumner (1990–1993)
 Home and Away as Rebecca Fisher (1989)
 Prime Time as Sandy Lockhart (1986)
 The Henderson Kids'' as Regina Powell (1985)

References

External links
 

Living people
Actresses from Melbourne
Australian film actresses
Australian soap opera actresses
Australian child actresses
Australian women comedians
Australian women radio presenters
Radio personalities from Melbourne
20th-century Australian actresses
21st-century Australian actresses
Year of birth missing (living people)
People from the City of Casey